Central solar heating is the provision of central heating and hot water from solar energy by a system in which the water is heated centrally by arrays of solar thermal collectors (central solar heating plants - CSHPs) and distributed through district heating pipe networks (or 'block heating' systems in the case of smaller installations).

For block systems, the solar collectors are typically mounted on the building roof tops. For district heating systems the collectors may instead be installed on the ground.

Central solar heating can involve large-scale thermal storage, scaling from diurnal storage to seasonal thermal energy storage (STES). Thermal storage increase the solar fraction - the ratio between solar energy gain to the total energy demand in the system - for solar thermal systems. Ideally, the aim for applying seasonal storage is to store solar energy collected in the summer time to the winter month.

Compared to small solar heating systems (solar combisystems), central solar heating systems have better price-performance ratios due to the lower installation price, the higher thermal efficiency and less maintenance. In some countries such as Denmark large-scale solar district heating plants are financially fully competitive to other forms of heat generation.

Central solar systems can also be used for solar cooling in the form of district cooling. In this case, the overall efficiency is high due to the high correlation between the energy demand and the solar radiation.

Largest CSHPs

Source: Jan Erik Nielsen, PlanEnergi, DK.

Hereafter you find a plant in Rise (DK) with a new collector producer, Marstal VVS (DK), a plant in Ry (DK), one of the oldest in Europe, a plant in Hamburg and a number of plants below 3,000 m2. It may be relevant mentioning, that the island of Ærø in Denmark has three of the major CSHP, Marstal, Ærøskøping and Rise.

History of central solar heating plants

The history of CSHP given here is mainly a Nordic-European perspective on the topic.

Sweden has played a major role in the development of large-scale solar heating. According to (Dalenbäck, J-O., 1993), the first steps were taken in the early seventies in Linköping, Sweden, followed by a mature revision in 1983 in Lyckebo, Sweden. Inspired by this work, Finland developed its first plant in Kerava, and the Netherlands built a first plant in Groningen. These plants are reported under the International Energy Agency by (Dalenbäck, J-O., 1990). Note that these plants did already combine CSHPs with large-scale thermal storage.

The first large-scale solar collector fields were made on-site in Torvalle, Sweden, 1982, 2000 m2 and Malung, Sweden, 640 m2. Prefabricated collector arrays were introduced in Nykvarn, Sweden, 4000 m2 in 1985. There was from the beginning a strong international perspective and cooperation within this research field, through investigation with the European Communities (Dalenbäck, J-O., 1995) and the International Energy Agency (Dalenbäck, J-O., 1990). Denmark did enter this research area parallel to the Swedish activities with a plant in Vester Nebel in 1987, one plant in Saltum in 1988 and one in Ry in 1989, taking over the know-how for prefabricated solar collectors of large size by the Swedish company Teknoterm by the dominating company ARCON, Denmark. In the later 1990s Germany and Switzerland were active among others with plants in Stuttgart and Chemnitz.

Due to cheap land prices, in the Nordic countries new collector arrays are ground-mounted (concrete foundations or pile-driven steel) in suitable areas (low-yield agricultural, industry etc.). Countries with high ground prices tend to place solar collectors on building roofs, following the 'block plant' variant of CSHPs. In Northern Europe, 20% solar heat of annual heating requirement is the economic optimum in a district heating plant when using above-ground storage tanks. If pond storage is used, the solar contribution can reach 50%.

By 1999 40 CSHPs were in operation in Europe generating about 30 MW of thermal power .

Related systems
Central solar heating is a sub-class of 'large-scale solar heating' systems - a term applied to systems with solar collector areas greater than 500 m2.

Aquifers, boreholes and artificial ponds (costing €30/m3) are used as heat storage (up to 90% efficient) in some central solar heating plants, which later extract the heat (similar to ground storage) via a large heat pump to supply district heating. Some of these are listed in the table above.

In Alberta, Canada the Drake Landing Solar Community has achieved a world record 97% annual solar fraction for heating needs, using solar-thermal panels on the garage roofs and thermal storage in a borehole cluster.

See also

District heating
Solar heating
Solar cooling
Solar combisystem
Solar thermal energy
District cooling
Renewable energy

References

External links
Solar District Heating in Europe: Large Scale Solar Heating Systems for Housing Developments
European Large-Scale Solar Heating Network Thermie Project
The European Large-Scale Solar Heating Network's former Homepage
17.081 m2 CSHP at Ærø, Denmark
      CSHP with an aquifer thermal energy store, Rostock, Germany
CSHPs in Germany
Ranking List of European Large Scale Solar Heating Plants
Current data on Danish solar heat plants

Further reading
 Nicolas Perez-Mora et al.: Solar district heating and cooling: A review. International Journal of Energy Research 42, 4, 2018, 1419-1441 .
Central Solar Heating Plants with Seasonal Storage: A Status Report, Swedish Council for Building Research, June 1990 .

Solar architecture
Solar thermal energy
District heating